One More Try: An Anthology is a compilation album by American singer-songwriter Gregg Allman, released on September 23, 1997, by Polygram Records and Capricorn Records. The set collects demos, outtakes, and previously unreleased alternate versions of songs by Allman, mainly dating from the period in which he recorded his first solo album, Laid Back (1973).

It was promptly pulled from distribution shortly after its release and has been out of print since.

Background
One More Try was compiled by Kirk West and Alan Paul, with Paul penning the essay in the album's liner notes. Paul mentions the release in his 2014 book One Way Out, commenting, "It's a true shame that this collection, which so beautifully reveals a hidden side of Gregg—vulnerable, acoustic, aching, soulful—is deeply out of print." No reason for its discontinuing has ever been given.

Geoffrey Himes of The Washington Post considered it a "most unusual retrospective," and wrote, "Many of these rarities suffer from a lack of rhythmic push, but to hear Allman growling and purring his way through his favorite Muddy Waters, Jackson Browne and Bobby Bland tunes as well as his own originals is a genuine treat." Thom Owens at AllMusic gave it 4.5 stars out of 5 and said, "Although it may be a little too comprehensive for some tastes, One More Try: An Anthology is the definitive Gregg Allman collection."

Many of these tracks have subsequently been released on the 2019 double disc remastered edition of Allman's Laid Back.

Track listing

Notes

References

External links
 Official website

1997 albums
Gregg Allman albums
Capricorn Records albums